Preston J. Pardus (born February 15, 1997) is an American professional racing driver who competes in the Sports Car Club of America as well as part-time in the NASCAR Xfinity Series, driving the No. 50 Chevrolet Camaro for his own team, Pardus Racing. Pardus won the Spec Miata class at the 2017 SCCA National Championship Runoffs and claimed the 2020 Super Sweep in the Spec Miata division. He is the son of former NASCAR driver Dan Pardus.

Racing career
Racing Spec Miatas, Pardus won the 2017 SCCA National Championship Runoffs on a last-lap pass. Pardus was also selected by Mazda Motorsports as a finalist to compete at the Mazda Road to 24 Shootout in late 2017. In 2019, Pardus started the Super Tour off with a win at Sebring International Raceway in January, competing in the Central Florida region of the SCCA. He went on to win the SCCA Majors Southeast Conference Championship that year, topping a series with over 150 entrants.

In August 2019, Pardus made his NASCAR Xfinity Series debut in the 2019 CTECH Manufacturing 180 at Road America. While the start came with his family Pardus Racing Inc. team, Pardus' car was an old Chip Ganassi Racing chassis, was powered by an Earnhardt Childress Engines engine, and the at-track effort was headed by Tony Furr, who served as crew chief. He returned to the series in July 2020 for the Pennzoil 150 on the Indianapolis Motor Speedway road course, driving for DGM Racing. After starting 19th, Pardus ended the race in tenth for his first top-ten finish in NASCAR. At the SCCA Runoffs that year, Pardus avoided a first-lap melee and went from seventh to the lead on the final lap to claim his second Runoffs victory in the Spec Miata class. In doing so, he also garnered the 2020 Super Sweep award for the Spec Miata division, awarded to any driver who wins the Runoffs, point standings and a major conference championship in the same season.

In 2021, Pardus returned to DGM for the second year in a row to run the road course races in the Xfinity Series. In his first race on his schedule, the Daytona Road Course, he was entered in the team's No. 91, a new part-time fourth car for them, but due to there being over 40 cars on the entry list and the race not having qualifying, the No. 91 was excluded and missed the field as a result of being too low in owner points. DGM then moved Pardus to their full-time No. 90 car, which was to be driven by Caesar Bacarella that weekend until he was replaced by Pardus. He came back to the 91 at the Pit Boss 250. Pardus posted his best finish of 7th at the Charlotte Roval.

In 2023, Pardus returned to driving for his own team in the Xfinity Series, which he last did in 2019. However, "Inc." was no longer a part of the re-started Pardus family team's name and the No. 43, which the team used in 2019, was taken by Alpha Prime Racing starting in 2023, so the team switched to the No. 50, a number that Pardus' father Dan used in the Cup Series in 1999 driving for Midwest Transit Racing. The first Xfinity Series race Preston and his team will run in 2023 is Circuit of the Americas.

Personal life
Pardus' father Dan formerly competed in the NASCAR Winston Cup Series, NASCAR Busch Series and ARCA Re/Max Series. He graduated from Spruce Creek High School in 2015.

His family owns Danus Utilities, Inc., an underground utility company that Pardus works for when he is not racing. Danus Utilities has also sponsored his race cars.

Motorsports career results

SCCA National Championship Runoffs

NASCAR
(key) (Bold – Pole position awarded by qualifying time. Italics – Pole position earned by points standings or practice time. * – Most laps led.)

Xfinity Series

 Season still in progress 
 Ineligible for series points

References

External links
 

Living people
1997 births
NASCAR drivers
People from New Smyrna Beach, Florida
Racing drivers from Florida
SCCA National Championship Runoffs participants